Daniel Cave (born 9 February 1999) is an Australian swimmer. He competed in the men's 100 metre breaststroke event at the 2017 World Aquatics Championships.

References

External links
 

1999 births
Living people
Australian male freestyle swimmers
Place of birth missing (living people)
World Aquatics Championships medalists in swimming
Australian male breaststroke swimmers